The 1987 Toronto Argonauts finished in second place in the East Division with an 11–6–1 record. They appeared in the Grey Cup game.

Offseason

Regular season

Standings

Schedule

Postseason

Grey Cup

Awards and honours

1987 CFL All-Stars

References

Toronto Argonauts seasons
James S. Dixon Trophy championship seasons
1987 Canadian Football League season by team